WTBC-LP was a low-powered television station licensed to Tallahassee, Florida. The station was owned by Temple Baptist Church, Inc. As W65BG, it was affiliated with the religious network ACTS. As WTBC-LP, it was affiliated with FamilyNet, The Worship Network, and the Total Living Network.

On February 15, 2013, the station's license was cancelled by the Federal Communications Commission.

References

External links 

 Official website (archive link)

Television stations in Tallahassee, Florida